Mohammad Shahzaib Hasan Khan, (born 25 December 1989) is a Pakistani cricketer who has been banned for four years, for his involvement in spot-fixing. Previously, he played domestic cricket for Karachi Zebras, making his debut with them in the 2008–09 season.

After some notable limited overs performances opening the batting for Karachi Zebras (250 runs in seven games at a strike rate of 96.11), Hasan was one of two uncapped players in the Pakistan squad for the 2009 ICC World Twenty20. In February 2018, he was banned for one year, extended to four years after an appeal, for his part in the 2017 Pakistan Super League spot-fixing scandal.

Career 
After poor performances by Salman Butt at the start of the tournament, he made his Twenty20 international debut on 13 June 2009 against New Zealand scoring 35 off 28 balls hitting 4 fours and 2 sixes. He maintained his place in the side, scoring 19 runs in the final against Sri Lanka as Pakistan went on to win the 2009 ICC World Twenty20.

After his performance in the Twenty20 he gained a lot of weight and wasn't chosen for touring in any formats of the game, however he was named in the 2010 Asia Cup squad along with many surprises such as Shoaib Akhtar, Asad Shafiq, Umar Amin and Abdur Rehman. He then scored his maiden fifty against Bangladesh in his third ODI during the 2010 Asia Cup.
He was then selected in the neutral test series against Australia in 2010. He was also selected for the ODI and Twenty20 series against England. Shahzaib Hasan then participated in the warm-up match against Somerset (just before the England series) and scored 105 runs and made a 169-run stand with Fawad Alam for the fourth wicket.

Shahzaib initially wasn't selected for the tour of South Africa in October 2010, but after pressure from captain Shahid Afridi, the team management of Waqar Younis, Aaqib Javed and Intikhab Alam the selectors added Shahzaib and fast-bowler Wahab Riaz to the ODI and Twenty20 squads. Shahzaib performed well in the 2010-11 Faysal Bank Twenty-20 Cup He scored 239 runs in the tournament and helped his new domestic team the Karachi Dolphins to the final of the tournament. He scored 33 runs in the final but couldn't stop Karachi Dolphins sliding to defeat as the Lahore Lions had scored 221 runs the Dolphins were bowled out for 184 with 4 deliveries left. Shahzaib's highest score during the tournament was 101* and he was the only person to score a century in the tournament.

PSL spot-fixing
In February 2018, Hasan was banned for one year and fined one million Pakistani rupees for his alleged role in 2017 Pakistan Super League spot-fixing scandal. In August 2018, his review appeal resulted in the ban being extended to four years and the fine upheld.

References

External links

1989 births
Living people
Cricketers banned for corruption
Pakistan One Day International cricketers
Pakistan Twenty20 International cricketers
Pakistani cricketers
Cricketers from Karachi
Karachi Zebras cricketers
Karachi Dolphins cricketers
Rajshahi Royals cricketers
Port Qasim Authority cricketers
Karachi Blues cricketers
Karachi Whites cricketers
Sindh cricketers
Karachi Kings cricketers